The Chirui is a left tributary of the river Vârghiș in Romania. It flows into the Vârghiș near Băile Chirui.

References

Rivers of Romania
Rivers of Harghita County